Allochrysolina is a subgenus of the genus Chrysolina of the subfamily Chrysomelinae within the family of leaf beetles. Species of this subgenus are found in Europe and North Africa.

References

Chrysomelinae
Insect subgenera